Thomas James Mercer (20 August 1910 – 7 December 1985) was an Australian rules footballer who played with Hawthorn in the Victorian Football League (VFL).

Mercer later served in the Australian Army for four years during World War II.

Notes

External links 

1910 births
1985 deaths
Australian rules footballers from Victoria (Australia)
Hawthorn Football Club players